The regional anthem of the city of Rîbnița, known as the "Hymn of Rîbnița", is the anthem of Rîbnița and the Rîbnița District, in Transnistria. It was composed by Alexander Tokarev and selected by the city council in 2013 to become Rîbnița's anthem to commemorate its 75th anniversary as a locality with official city status. It was officially adopted in 2014.

The Hymn of Rîbnița is unique among Transnistria's anthems, as it is only composed in Russian, and not trilingual like the official state anthem.

Official lyrics

References

Rîbnița
Regional songs
2014 establishments in Moldova